The Hamptons are a group of villages and hamlets in Long Island, New York.

The Hamptons or Hamptons may also refer to:

 Hamptons, Calgary, Canada
 The Hamptons, Edmonton, Canada
 The Hamptons, London, England
 The Hamptons, Long Island AVA, a wine region
 "The Hamptons" (Seinfeld)
 The Hamptons (TV series)
 Hamptons (magazine), distributed in The Hamptons of New York

See also
 
 Hampton (disambiguation)
 The Hampdens